William or Bill Nichols may refer to:
William Nichols (English priest), Dean of Chester, 1644–1657
William Nichols, secretary of John Fell, 17th century clergyman
William Nichols (mariner) (fl. 1758–1780), English sea captain
William Nichols (architect) (1780–1853), English-born American architect
William T. Nichols (1829–1882), American politician, soldier, and businessman
William Nichols (Medal of Honor) (1837–?), American Civil War sailor and Medal of Honor recipient
William Ripley Nichols (1847–1886), American chemist and leading authority on water purification
William Ford Nichols (1849–1924), Bishop of California in the Episcopal Church
William Francis Nichols (1852–1917), American businessman and politician
William H. Nichols (1852–1930), American chemist and businessman
William Nichols, founder of Nichols School, Buffalo, New York, in 1892
Bill Nichols (politician) (1918–1988), United States Representative from Alabama
Billy Nichols (born 1940), American musician
Bill Nichols (film critic) (born 1942), American historian and film theorist
William Nichols (artist) (born 1942), American artist

See also 
William Nicholls (disambiguation)
William Nicholson (disambiguation)